Jim Lavalley (born 6 October 1948) is a Canadian bobsledder. He competed in the two man and the four man events at the 1976 Winter Olympics.

References

1948 births
Living people
Canadian male bobsledders
Olympic bobsledders of Canada
Bobsledders at the 1976 Winter Olympics
Sportspeople from Montreal